Wardell is a village in the Northern Rivers region of New South Wales, Australia. It is situated on the Richmond River and the Pacific Highway between Broadwater and Ballina. The boundaries are within the Ballina Shire local government area.

Population
Wardell had a population of 621 in the 2006 Census: 48.3% were males and 51.7% were females. Of the total population in Wardell 8.9% were Indigenous persons. The most common occupations for employed persons were: technicians and trades workers at 16.3%, labourers 15.1%, community and personal service workers 13.2%, managers 11.6% and professionals 11.2%.

History
Bingall Creek was an old name of Wardell and it was also known in the 1850s as the cedar-getter's settlement, Blackwall which was established as a river port on the Richmond River. The river was an important transport route for the region for the first 100 years after settlement. It developed into an important sawmilling centre for the timber industry and later for the milling of sugar cane. Wardell is now split by the Pacific Highway and the River and is known by its landmark lift span bridge which was built to replace the ferries and barges used to transport Australian red cedar (Toona ciliata) and sugar cane in the 1800s. A steamboat service from Ballina to Lismore operated for many years. Today Wardell has a general store, post office, pub, service station and the Wardell Public School which has 50 pupils enrolled.

The river and its estuaries abound with marine wildlife and are used for recreational fishing and water sports.

Wardell was the birthplace of architect Alexander Stewart Jolly (1887–1957), who designed a number of buildings in the north coast area. He also designed a number of homes in the Sydney area, some of which are heritage-listed. Poet and painter Edwin Wilson (b. 1942) spent his first six years in a farm house at East Wardell (as recorded in 'The Mullumbimby Kid').

References

External links

Ballina Shire
Towns in New South Wales
Northern Rivers